Agonidium natalense is a species of ground beetle in the subfamily Platyninae. It was described by Boheman in 1848.

References

natalense
Beetles described in 1848